The 1985 FA Charity Shield (also known as the General Motors FA Charity Shield for sponsorship reasons) was the 63rd FA Charity Shield, an annual football match played between the winners of the previous season's First Division and FA Cup competitions. The match was played on 10 August 1985 at Wembley Stadium and contested by Everton, who had won the 1984–85 First Division, and Manchester United, who had won the 1984–85 FA Cup. Everton won 2–0 with goals from Trevor Steven and Adrian Heath. Trevor Steven put Everton into the lead when he swept home from six yards after a cross from the left in the first half. The second goal came in the second half when Manchester United goalkeeper Gary Bailey dropped a cross from the left to allow Adrian Heath to tip the ball past him into the left corner of the net.

The Charity Shield was the first competitive game that new striker Gary Lineker played for Everton, and although he failed to get on the scoresheet in the game he made up for it by scoring 40 goals in all competitions that season. He took the place in the team previously occupied by Andy Gray. Kevin Moran of Manchester United had been sent off in the final and he was suspended for this game, with his place in the side being taken by understudy Graeme Hogg, and Gordon Strachan was replaced by Mike Duxbury. These were the only differences between the first XI of this game and the FA Cup final earlier in May 1985.

Match details

See also
1984–85 Football League
1984–85 FA Cup

1985
Charity Shield
Charity Shield 1985
Charity Shield 1985
Comm